Magen David Square is a public square in the heart of Tel Aviv, Israel. It got its name from the fact that streets are radiating from it in six directions: Allenby Street in two directions, plus King George, Menahem Sheinkin, HaCarmel with the Carmel Market, and Nahalat Binyamin. The square is one of the busiest in the city center.

Squares in Tel Aviv
Modernist architecture in Israel